Black Rock Halt was a railway station in Gwynedd, located between Criccieth and Porthmadog on the former Aberystwith and Welsh Coast Railway. It served the popular beach at Black Rock Sands beyond the headland it is named after.

History

The halt, which could be accessed by a path from the foot of the Black Rock, consisted of a  wooden platform and was opened on 9 July 1923 by the Great Western Railway, which saw itself as the 'holiday line'. It closed on safety grounds in August 1976, but was not officially closed until 27 June 1977. No trace of the wooden platform now remains.

The site today
Trains on the Cambrian Line pass the site of the former station, which is just about discernible on modern aerial photography. The site of the halt can be seen from the Wales Coast Path.

References

Sources
 
 
 
 

Disused railway stations in Gwynedd
Criccieth
Former Great Western Railway stations
Railway stations in Great Britain opened in 1923
Railway stations in Great Britain closed in 1976
1923 establishments in Wales